"R.I.P. 2 My Youth" is a song by American alternative pop group the Neighbourhood. It was released on August 20, 2015 as the lead single of their second album Wiped Out! A music video for the track, directed by Hype Williams was released on September 16, 2015. The song entered the UK Singles Chart at No. 85. It was their first time to enter this chart after their hit single "Sweater Weather".

Chart performance

Weekly charts

Year-end charts

Certifications

References

External links

The Neighbourhood songs
2015 songs
2015 singles
Columbia Records singles
Songs written by Benny Blanco
Music videos directed by Hype Williams